Tiquire Flores Fútbol Club (usually called Tiquire Flores) was a professional football club. The club has one Copa Venezuela title in 1964. The club is based in Aragua.

History
In the 1964 Venezuelan Primera División season, the club was defeated by Deportivo Galicia in the finals.

The club was 1964 Copa Venezuela champion, when defeated Unión Deportiva Canarias.

On 1966, the club changed his name to Aragua FC until 1970 when changed to Tiquire Aragua.

On 1974, the club changed his name to Tiquire–Canarias, when fused with Unión Deportiva Canarias.

Titles

National
Primera División Venezolana: 0
Runner-up (1): 1964
Copa Venezuela: 1
Winners (1): 1964
Runner-up (1): 1963

Football clubs in Venezuela
Defunct football clubs in Venezuela